Prakash Rao Kovelamudi is an Indian film director, screenwriter, and actor known for his works in alternative cinema, across various languages. He is known for works such as Morning Raga (2004), with which he made his Bollywood acting debut. He then directed Bommalata (2004), which received Best Film in Telugu at the 53rd National Film Awards, the fantasy film, Anaganaga O Dheerudu (2011),  and the black comedy, Judgementall Hai Kya (2019). An alumnus of the Lee Strasberg Theatre and Film Institute, Prakash is the son of veteran director K. Raghavendra Rao and grandson of K. S. Prakash Rao.

Film career
Kovelamudi made his acting debut with the Telugu-language movie Neetho. He was set to act in a fantasy film directed by Rajamouli but the film was later shelved.
He also appeared in Morning Raga. The films under his directorial belt include Bommalata (A belly full of dreams) and the Telugu fantasy film Anaganaga O Dheerudu, distributed by Walt Disney Studios Motion Pictures.
 He also directed the film Size Zero, which is also known as Inji Iduppazhagi, starring Arya and Anushka Shetty. His most recent film is Judgemental Hai Kya, a black comedy which addresses mental health issues.

Personal life
Kovelamudi married Kanika Dhillon in 2014 and the couple divorced in 2017.

Filmography
All films are in Telugu unless otherwise noted.

Awards
National Film Award for Best Feature Film in Telugu - Bommalata (playing with toys) - 2006

References

Living people
Telugu-language writers
Indian male screenwriters
Indian male dramatists and playwrights
Lee Strasberg Theatre and Film Institute alumni
Telugu film directors
Film directors from Hyderabad, India
1975 births
Telugu screenwriters
Male actors in Telugu cinema
Indian male film actors
Male actors from Hyderabad, India
Screenwriters from Hyderabad, India